Walter Kamper (6 October 1931 – 26 September 2015) was an Austrian pianist.

Life 
Born in Vienna, Kamper studied at the Vienna University of Music and Performing Arts with Richard Hauser and at the Berlin State University of Music and Performing Arts with Helmut Roloff. He made his debut as a concert pianist in 1951 in Vienna. From 1963 until his retirement in 2000, he taught at the University of Music and Performing Arts Graz. With Michael Schnitzler and Walther Schulz, he founded the Haydn Trio Wien in 1964. In 1979, he was appointed full professor of piano at the university.

Kamper was a laureate of numerous international competitions, including the Geneva International Music Competition 1952 and the 1960 Brussels Queen Elisabeth Competition. In 1996, he was awarded the Austrian Decoration for Science and Art.

Kamper died in Graz at the age of 83.

References

External links 
 ORF-Online: Obituary
 

Austrian classical pianists
Male classical pianists
Academic staff of the University of Music and Performing Arts Graz
Recipients of the Austrian Cross of Honour for Science and Art, 1st class
1931 births
2015 deaths
Musicians from Vienna